Akhtarin is a town in northern Aleppo Governorate, northwestern Syria. The largest town and administrative centre of Nahiya Akhtarin of the A'zaz District has a population of 5,305 in the 2004 census.

References

Towns in Aleppo Governorate
Populated places in Azaz District